Telford is an Old English place-name which derives from the elements "taelf", meaning "a plateau" and "forda", meaning "a shallow river crossing". There are several places named in the 1086 Domesday Book, the usual spelling being "Tejleford" of "Tevellsford" in Somerset, Warwickshire and Berkshire.

It is held by some that Telford derives from the medieval French nickname for a soldier Taille-Fer (one who cuts with iron, see Telfer and Taillefer).

References

Names of places in the United Kingdom